Floris Diergaardt (born 23 September 1980 in Windhoek) is a Namibian football striker currently playing for FC Civics.  He is a member of the Namibia national football team.

Early in his career, Diergaardt played in the fourth-tier German Oberliga with TuS Germania Schnelsen.

Club history
  1998/1999 Germania Schnelsen (D)
  1999/2000 Young Ones FC
  2000/2001 Ajax Cape Town (SA)
  2001/2002 Avendale Athletico (SA)

References

External links

1980 births
Living people
Footballers from Windhoek
Namibia international footballers
Association football forwards
Cape Town Spurs F.C. players
F.C. Civics Windhoek players
Namibian expatriate sportspeople in South Africa
Namibian expatriate footballers
Expatriate soccer players in South Africa
Namibian men's footballers